Slatina is a village in the municipality of Andrijevica, Montenegro.

Demographics
According to the 2011 census, it had a population of 449 people.

References

Populated places in Andrijevica Municipality
Serb communities in Montenegro